Broderick Wright (born 24 July 1987) is an Australian former professional rugby league footballer who played for the Cronulla-Sutherland Sharks in the National Rugby League, as a .

Playing career
After graduating from Baulkham Hills High School in 2005, Wright made his debut against the North Queensland Cowboys in round 20 of the 2008 NRL season.

Wright was 18th man for Parramatta against Melbourne in the 2009 Grand Final as an injury stand-by for Nathan Cayless.

Wright signed with the Cronulla-Sutherland Sharks for the 2010 NRL season.

Wright was the first ever and so far only Parramatta Eels player to start his junior career playing the game for the Junior Eels, at a young age, and work his way up through the system into the First Grade side, playing for Parramatta junior teams Junior Eels, Harold Matts, SG Ball, and the Toyota Cup squad.

Wright joined French rugby league club Pia for 2011/12 season.

References

External links

Cronulla Sharks debut
NRL Player Profile

1987 births
Living people
Australian rugby league players
Australian people of German descent
Baroudeurs de Pia XIII players
Cronulla-Sutherland Sharks players
Parramatta Eels players
People educated at Baulkham Hills High School
Rugby league players from Sydney
Rugby league props
Rugby league second-rows